Anamaría Tijoux Merino (born 12 June 1977), commonly known by her stage name Ana Tijoux or Anita Tijoux, is a Chilean-French singer and musician. She became famous in Latin America as the MC of hip-hop group Makiza during the late 1990s. In 2006, she crossed over to the mainstream of Latin pop after her collaboration with Mexican songstress Julieta Venegas in the radio hit "Eres para mí". Tijoux has often been praised for "exploring sensitive matters devoid of violence." She gained more widespread recognition following her second solo album, 1977, and later with La bala (2011) and Vengo (2014) which brought her a Best Artist of the year award in the 2015's Premios Pulsar.

Tijoux is the daughter of Chilean parents living in political exile in France during Augusto Pinochet's dictatorship in Chile.

Biography
Anamaría Tijoux Merino was born on 12 June 1977 in Lille, France. She is the daughter of two Chilean exiles who fled Chile to France after the 1973 Chilean coup d'état. Her mother is the renowned Chilean sociologist María Emilia Tijoux. In 1978, her family moved to Paris, France. It was not until 1983 that Anamaría traveled to Chile and met her grandparents and extended family who stayed in the country despite the coup.

In 1988, Tijoux met Consuelo Vergara, who taught Tijoux how to rap and sparked Tijoux's interest in hip-hop and dance. Tijoux moved to Chile after the return of civil power in 1993. In 1995, influenced by the local rap group Makul in Santiago, Chile, Tijoux formed her own group called Los Gemelos with Zaturno, another rap artist. In 1997, Tijoux became widely popular for her participation in the group Los Tetas and their first studio album release. She and Zaturno collaborated with Seo2, Cenzi, and DJ Squat to form the group Makiza.

1997–2006: Makiza 

In 1997, the group released their first CD, Vida Salvaje, with great success even though it was an independent production.

In 1999, Makiza released "Aerolineas Makiza" on Sony Music Entertainment, who became interested in Chilean rap as a result of Tiro de Gracia, a bestselling Chilean rap group. Makiza's album included new and improved versions of songs from Vida Salvaje with two new songs, one of which was the hit single "La Rosa de los Vientos". This album put Makiza at the top of the Latin American hip-hop market, as their style was much more evolved than other groups at the time. The production style resembled the New York underground sound inspired by the Native Tongues, and the lyrics of Makiza lacked the overwhelming "machismo" and violence of average rap. This helped the group receive approval from a wider population.

In 2000, Makiza covered the popular song "Somos tontos, no pesados" by Los Tres. At the end of that year, the members of Makiza separated due to its members' desire to work on personal projects before their tour through neighboring countries. Tijoux specified that she would be abandoning hip-hop and her music career.

In 2003, Tijoux returned to Chile and worked on musical projects with Aluzinati, a Chilean funk band. She also recorded "Lo Que Tu Me Das" with Mexican singer Julieta Venegas for the soundtrack to the film Subterra, and appeared as a featured artist on Mexican hip-hop group Control Machete's final album Uno, dos: Bandera.

In 2004, Makiza came back together and announced a tour to promote the re-release of Vida Salvaje, which was remastered and in CD format. Tijoux and Seo2, the only musically active remaining members of the group, decided to reunite the band and work on new material. The group released its third album in 2005, Casino Royale, under the independent label Bizarre Records. The album involved various producers, rather than one producer like previous albums released, and involved a third Chilean MC, Sonido Ácido. During this time, Tijoux also voiced "Nea" in the animated series Pulentos.

In 2006, the group broke up permanently due to differences in beliefs about musical production and direction.

Solo career

In November 2006, Tijoux released her first single "Ya no fue" and debuted as a solo artist. Due to problems with "La Oreja" record label, her first album which was produced by Erasmo de la Parra and Camilo Salinas was never released. In January 2007, Tijoux collaborated again with Julieta Venegas on her song "Eres para mi" from her album Limón y sal. The two artists achieved major success in Latin America.

In September 2007, Tijoux released her first solo album under the independent label Oveja Negra, founded by the Sociedad Chilena del Derecho. The album was titled Kaos, and its first single, "Despabilate", was well accepted by the Chilean public and nominated at the Latino MTV Video Music Awards under the categories Best New Artist and Best Urban Artist. She was also nominated for Song of the Year with Julieta Venegas on their collaboration "Eres Para Mi".

On 29 June 2009, Tijoux performed at the Mexican music festival Vive Latino and continued touring across Mexico soon thereafter.

In March 2010, Tijoux released her second solo album, 1977, titled after the year she was born. The album was very much a return to her rap roots, paying homage to the "golden age of hip-hop". The album was largely autobiographical, exploring themes from her own life that included the death of a close friend, experiencing creative crises, friendships, and bad luck, among others. The album marked a significant distancing from the pop music and pop collaborations Tijoux had been doing in collaboration with other artists. She rapped on this album in both Spanish and French as a raw and direct, as well as mature, MC. The album was produced by Hordatoj, Foex, and Tee of the Potoco Discos label with Habitacion del Panico. The album and single 1977 were immediate hits in the underground rap circles of Chile. The record was amongst the top 10 in 2009 for the blog WorldHipHopMarket.com and it was picked up by the United States-based Latino Alternative label Nacional Records, who released it the next year. Tijoux was invited to perform at the South by Southwest (SXSW) Music Festival in Austin, Texas. She soon began her first North American tour. On 24 May 2010 Thom Yorke, the lead singer of Radiohead, advised his listeners to listen to 1977, on a list he created of his favorite bands and songs. The list also featured popular artists such as The John Coltrane Quartet Plays and Björk. Yorke introduced the song as one of his favorite ones of the summer. In 2011, the song was featured on the EA Sports video game FIFA 11. It also appears in Breaking Bad (season 4, episode 5).

In September 2012, Tijoux was featured in a campaign called "30 Songs / 30 Days" to support Half the Sky: Turning Oppression into Opportunity for Women Worldwide, a multi-platform media project inspired by Nicholas Kristof and Sheryl WuDunn's book. On 19 September 2011 MTV Iggy put her in the first position of his list "Best New Female Emcees Dominating Mics Everywhere".

In 2014, Tijoux performed at the SXSW music festival, and based on her performance she was subsequently named "Best Rapper en Español" by Rolling Stone magazine. This year Tijoux also won her first Latin Grammy for Record of the Year for the song "Universos paralelos", a collaboration with Uruguayan musician Jorge Drexler.

In 2020, Tijoux's feminist-themed song "No estamos solas" was chosen as theme song for La Jauría, the first Chilean Amazon Prime Video original series, which premiered on 10 July. In November 2020, Tijoux was included on the BBC's 100 Women 2020 list, highlighting her involvement "in campaigns against inequality and oppression in the world".

Personal life 
Tijoux was born in Lille, and moved with her parents to Paris when she was 6 years old. She returned to Chile with her parents aged 14, and was given a scholarship to study at a private school for French immigrants located in Vitacura. After finishing school, she entered university to study design and began working as a part-time waitress.

After the 1998 debut of Makiza and the sudden fame and recognition she started to acquire, Tijoux felt overwhelmed and decided to put a halt on her musical career and return to her anonymity in France, where she started working in a variety of jobs, such as a waitress, school inspector, janitor, and pollster. A few years later she decided to come back to Chile to start her solo career as a rapper.

In February 2019, Tijoux married Jon Grandcamp Jr, a French fellow musician. In June 2019, Tijoux left Chile to permanently settle in Paris, France, with Grandcamp and her two children.

Discography

Studio albums 
Kaos (2007)
1977 (2010)
Elefant Mixtape (2011)
La Bala (2011)
Vengo (2014)

Singles
"Calaveritas" (feat. Celso Piña) (2016)
"Luchín" (2016)
"Cacerolazo" (2019)
"Libertad" (2020)
"Antifa Dance" (2020)
"No estamos solas" (2020)
"Pa que" (2020)
"Rebelión de octubre" (feat. MC Millaray) (2020)
"Mal" (2021)

Collaborations
 "Santiago penando estás" – Después de Vivir un Siglo – Tributo a Violeta Parra (2001)
 "Subdemo" – FDA
 "Uno, dos: bandera" – Control Machete
 "Roda Do Funk" – Funk Como Le Gusta
 "Lo que tú me das" – Julieta Venegas
 Eres para mí – Julieta Venegas
 "Vuelve" – Julieta Venegas
 "Freno de mano" – Los Tres
 "La medicina" – Los Tetas
 "Supervielle" – Bajofondo Tango Club
 "Música para después del almuerzo – Bitman & Roban
 "E.L.H.Y.L.D." – Hordatoj
 "Tú y tu mirar, yo y mi canción" – Los Bunkers
 "No me digas" – Sayag Jazz Machine
 "Veneno" – Aerstame
 "Ayer" – Hordatoj (El tintero)''
 "Si te preguntan" – Los Aldeanos
 "Suena" – Ondatrópica produced by Will Holland & Mario Galeano (2012)
 "Hypnotized" – Morcheeba
 "Somos Sur" – Shadia Mansour
 "Sr.Cobranza 25 años" – Las Manos de Filippi
 "Hit Me" – MTV Unplugged Molotov (2018)
 "El extraño viaje" - Los chikos del maíz (2019)
 "Lightning Over Mexico" – Tom Morello & The Bloody Beetroots (2021)

Grammy Awards

Latin Grammy Awards

References

1977 births
Chilean women rappers
21st-century Chilean women singers
Chilean rappers
Chilean singer-songwriters
French women rappers
French people of Chilean descent
Grammy Award winners
Latin Grammy Award winners
Living people
Spanish-language singers of France
Trip hop musicians
Latin music songwriters
Nacional Records artists
21st-century French women singers
Women hip hop musicians
Chilean people of French descent
Musicians from Lille
Naturalized citizens of Chile
Feminist musicians
Feminist rappers
BBC 100 Women
20th-century Chilean women singers
Women in Latin music
Palestinian solidarity activists